Steve Ramon (born 29 December 1979 in Bruges) is a Belgian former professional motocross racer. He competed in the Motocross World Championships from 1996 to 2011. Ramon was a two-time motocross world champion.

Ramon rode a KTM to win the 2003 125cc Motocross World Champion. He also won the 2007 MX1 world championship despite not winning a single Grand Prix race. Ramon raced for the Teka Suzuki team managed by former world champion Eric Geboers and his brother Sylvain Geboers, until an injury ended his GP career in 2011. He also won the 125cc Belgian national championship in 1999 and, the MX1-GP Belgian national championship in 2004 and 2006.

In 2011, Ramon won the Le Touquet beach race in France.

References

External links
 Team Suzuki web site

Belgian motocross riders
1979 births
Living people
Sportspeople from Bruges